Lejla Agolli (born 4 October 1950) is an Albanian composer.

Early life 
Agolli was born in Korçë, Albania.

Education 
Agolli studied composition and orchestration in Tiranassa Tish Daijan.

Career 
Agolli was winner of the National Civic Song Festival for the song Ah ky mall sung by Frederik Ndoci. Agolli served for several years as artistic director to The National Ensemble of Folk Songs and Dancing.

Works
Agolli's compositions include cantata, symphonies, concertos and chamber music. Selected works include:

Ah ky mall
Fantasy for violin and orchestra
In Memoriam for solo clarinet and string orchestra, dedicated to Mother Teresa
Poema for violin and orchestra
Rondo No.1 for violin and orchestra
Rondo No.2 for violin and orchestra
Violin concerto No.1
Violin concerto No.2

Filmography
 1976 Majlinda dhe zogu i vogël - Composer. Animation short.
 1976 Lisharsi - Composer. Animation short.

References

External links
 Lejla Agolli at musicalics.com
 Lejla Agolli at earsense.org
 Women Composers Programmed since 1978 at donneinmusica.org

1950 births
20th-century classical composers
Women classical composers
Albanian composers
Living people
21st-century classical composers
People from Korçë
20th-century women composers
21st-century women composers